Carlos Eduardo Teixeira Mendes (born 23 May 1947) is a Portuguese singer, best known for his participation in the 1968 and 1972 Eurovision Song Contest. Mendes also appeared in some television series.

Albums discography 
Amor Combate (LP, TLD, 1976)
Canções de Ex-Cravo e Malviver (LP, TLD, 1977)
Jardim Jaleco (LP, Rossil, 1978)
Antologia-(LP, Rossil, 1979)
Antologia II (LP, Rossil, 197-)
Triângulo do Mar (LP, Sassetti, 1980)
Chão do Vento (LP, Edisom, 1984)
O Natal do Pai natal 
Boa Nova (CD, 1992)
Não Me Peças Mais Canções (CD, 1994)
Vagabundo do Mar (CD, Movieplay, 1997)
Coração de Cantor (CD, Lusogram, 1999)

References

External links

1947 births
Living people
Eurovision Song Contest entrants of 1968
Eurovision Song Contest entrants of 1972
Singers from Lisbon
Eurovision Song Contest entrants for Portugal
20th-century Portuguese male singers